Macedonia for the Macedonians is a slogan and political concept used during the first half of the 20th century in the region of Macedonia. It aimed to encompass all the nationalities in the area, into a separate supranational entity.

History

William Gladstone

It was raised by the British politician William Ewart Gladstone in 1897, in an often misquoted 1897 citation, when he promoted the idea on some kind of mini-Balkan Federation in this region. Gladstone appealed for the right of self-determination of the peoples who resided in the region, while Britain regarded the creation of an autonomous Macedonia with a Christian governor as a possible solution of the Macedonian issue. By the term "Macedonians", some authors believe Gladstone had in mind the various ethnic groups residing in Macedonia, such as Bulgarians, Greeks, Jews, Turks, Aromanians and Albanians; not an imagined "Macedonian" ethnic group. Marin V. Pundeff summarizes that "Macedonia, in Gladstone's phrase, was for the Macedonians, that is, not only for the Bulgarian element... but for all the other ethnic elements residing in it as well". On that occasion, the British journalist G. W. Steevens also noted in the preface of the broshure containing the letter of Gladstone, that he has used "Macedonians" as a collective name of the diverse population of the region. Steevens explained that there were at least six different kind of Macedonians at that time. Once Gladstone launched the motto, this maxim became widely known. In 1898, the historian William Miller argued about Gladstone's proclamation and his motto, that this idea is not practical because there was no Macedonian nation and the whole difficulty in this country is that it is a mixture of different warring nationalities. By that reason per Allen Upward that phrase could not have been used by anybody, who had a first hand knowledge of that country.

Other authors interpret Gladstone's statement as acknowledging the Macedonians as a separate nationality, although few accepted the idea that there might be a separate Macedonian nation.

The motto was adopted by the Internal Macedonian-Adrianople Revolutionary Organization (IMARO) and by the Macedo-Romanian Cultural Society, in the early 20th century. At that time, according to Vasil Kanchov the local Bulgarians and Aromanians called themselves Macedonians, and the surrounding nations called them so.

Internal Macedonian-Adrianople Revolutionary Organization 
In an article published in June, 1902, the IMARO revolutionaries promoted the idea of autonomy and the slogans "Macedonia for the Macedonians". The Organization gave a guarantee for the preservation of all national communities there, and insisted that the Bulgarians could be proud of their tolerance, in opposition to Romanians, Serbs and Greeks. They also planned that the administration of the future autonomous Macedonia will rely on the Bulgarian majority. In the same year the Organization changed its exclusively Bulgarian character, and opened it to all Macedonians and Thracians regardless of nationality, who wished to participate in the anti-Ottoman movement. Those revolutionaries saw the future autonomous Macedonia as a multinational polity, and "Macedonian" was an umbrella term covering Greeks, Bulgarians, Turks, Aromanians and Megleno-Romanians, Albanians, Serbs, etc. Nevertheless, the British Consul in Skopje Raphael Fontana wrote on the occasion of the Ilinden uprising in 1903 that the revolutionaries were working for a general Bulgarian uprising in order to reach their goal of "Macedonia for the Macedonians", understood to mean "Macedonia for the Bulgarians". According to the prevailing view in the Bulgarian historical science, the idea of autonomy represented only a tactics aiming at the eventual unification with Bulgaria. Some independent researchers suggest that behind the slogan "Macedonia for the Macedonians" there was a backup plan for the incorporation of Macedonia into the Bulgarian state.

In 1902, Boris Sarafov tried to gain Serbian support for a "Macedonia for Macedonians", arguing that it was the only way to oppose Bulgarian annexationism. However one year later he changed his position, seeking a military intervention from Bulgaria in order to aid the Ilinden Uprising.

MPO and IMRO 
The Balkan Wars (1912–1913) and World War I (1914–1918) left the area divided mainly between Greece and Serbia (later Yugoslavia), which resulted in significant changes in its ethnic composition. The Bulgarian community was reduced, either by population exchanges or by forcible change of communities' ethnic identity. In this way the motto began to lose its authenthic character. Macedonian immigrants in the United States and Canada founded in 1922 in Fort Wayne, Indiana, the Macedonian Patriotic Organization. The founders of the MPO in their aspirations for a free and independent Macedonia also accepted the slogan "Macedonia for the Macedonians". The use of "Macedonians" and "Macedonian emigrants" then equally applied to all ethnic groups in Macedonia - Bulgarians, Wallachians, Turks, Albanians, Greeks and others. During the 1920s the descendant of the IMARO - IMRO followed also the idea about an independent United Macedonian multiethnic state with prevailing Bulgarian element, something as "Switzerland on the Balkans" and kept the slogan Macedonia for the Macedonians until its defunction in 1934.

Macedo-Romanian Cultural Society 
The Macedo-Romanian Cultural Society had as its members the acting Prime and Foreign Ministers, as well as the Head of the Romanian Orthodox Church, and the elite of the Romanian political class. In 1912 an Aromanian memoir was published in Bucharest, after the outbreak of the Balkan War. The memoir was signed by five prominent Romanian and Aromanian public figures, members of the Society. In it, the Macedonian-Aromanian Culture Society, using the slogan Macedonia for the Macedonians, stated that Macedonia's autonomy is the best solution of the Macedonian question. As the region was ethnically diverse, an autonomous, neutral, cantonized by Swiss model state was proposed, where all nationalities will preserve their mother tongues and religions, enjoying the same democratic political rights. In 1917, during the First World War, the memoir was translated into Esperanto and was published in Stockholm. The memoir was presented to the Peace Conference in Paris in 1919.

See also 
 Svoboda ili smart
 Independent Macedonia
 Autonomy for Macedonia
 Macedonian Question
 Macedonian nationalism
 Ullah Millet
 Principality of Pindus

Notes 

History of the Ottoman Empire
Proposed countries
History of Macedonia (region)
Internal Macedonian Revolutionary Organization
National mottos
History of North Macedonia